Josep Oller i Roca (1839–1922) was a Spanish entrepreneur who lived in Paris for most of his life. He co-founded the famous cabaret Moulin Rouge with Charles Zidler and was the inventor of the parimutuel betting.

Biography
Born in Terrassa, Josep Oller emigrated to France with his family as a child. Later, he moved back to Spain to study at the university in Bilbao. There, he became fond of cockfighting and started his career as a bookmaker.

Once in Paris, in 1867, Josep Oller invented a new method of wagering, which he named Pari Mutuel (French for Parimutuel betting). He successfully introduced his pool method system at French race tracks. Nonetheless, in 1874, Josep Oller was sentenced to fifteen days in prison and fined for operating illegal gambling. Later, in 1891, the French authorities legalised his system and banned fixed-odds betting. Quickly, Oller's Pari Mutuel spread across most race tracks around the world, but the method was operationalised in engineered systems like that of the automatic totalisator, invented by George Alfred Julius.

In 1870, he moved to London for a while to avoid the Franco-Prussian War. There he came into contact with the world of the stage.

From 1876, Joseph Oller focused his attention on the entertainment industry. 
First he opened various auditoriums and venues: Fantaisies Oller, La Bombonnière, Théâtre des Nouveautés, Nouveau Cirque and the Montagnes Russes. 
But it was in 1889, when he inaugurated the famous Moulin Rouge. In 1892, he opened the first Parisian music-hall: Paris Olympia offering new forms of entertainment.

He was buried at Père Lachaise Cemetery.

References

Further reading
 

1839 births
1921 deaths
Bookmakers
Impresarios
People from Terrassa
19th-century Spanish businesspeople
Businesspeople from Catalonia
Burials at Père Lachaise Cemetery
French people of Spanish descent
French people of Catalan descent
Moulin Rouge
20th-century Spanish businesspeople